Mats de Tonsberg or Mathias de Tonsberg (1638–1705) was a Norwegian civil servant and timber trader.

He was born in Tønsberg in Jarlsberg og Larvik county in Norway to civil servant Anders Madssøn (1609-1670) and Karen Stranger (1617-1698). He was a brother-in-law of Christian Stockfleth, and uncle of Karen Toller. Born into a wealthy family, he studied at the University of Copenhagen from 1655, and subsequently politics and history at the Leiden University from 1661.

After visiting several European universities, he returned to Norway in 1668, and was assigned an administrative position at the Akershus Castle. He was a member of Overhofretten court from 1684 until 1692. In 1704, he was named a member of Slottsloven. Tonsberg received the title of Chancellor in 1684 and rank of Councillor of State in 1704.

Career
In 1679 he was appointed as County Governor of Buskeruds amt, residing in the town of Drammen. He served there until 1694 when he was appointed as the Diocesan Governor of Christianssand stiftamt and simultaneously the County Governor of Nedenes og Bamble amt. He held both posts until 1700 when he was dismissed from his job due to his health. In 1704, he was appointed to be the Diocesan Governor of Bergenhus stiftamt and simultaneously the County Governor of Bergenhus amt. He only held this post for a few months before his health failed and forced him to resign in December of 1704. His son, Vilhelm de Tonsberg, replaced him as Diocesan Governor. He died a few months later in 1705 in Bergen.

Besides his public services, he was running a timber trading business. From his base in Drammen, he ran exports of lumber and collaboration with the city's leading merchants and ship owners.

References

1638 births
1705 deaths
People from Tønsberg
University of Copenhagen alumni
Leiden University alumni
Norwegian civil servants
17th-century Norwegian businesspeople
Government ministers of Norway
Norwegian businesspeople in timber
County governors of Norway